Sphecomyia columbiana is a species of syrphid fly in the family Syrphidae.

Distribution
Canada.

References

Eristalinae
Insects described in 1965
Diptera of North America
Hoverflies of North America